TaiwanPlus (stylized as Taiwan+) is a state-owned free English-language streaming service and international television channel based in Taiwan. It was launched on 30 August 2021 and targeted at an international audience. The platform provides international and local news, along with other programming centered on Taiwan.

History 
The service was launched on 30 August 2021. It is overseen by the Ministry of Culture (MOC) and operated by the Central News Agency (CNA). The MOC first publicly expressed interest in an international streaming service in July 2020, but a proposal involving the Public Television Service (PTS) was met with backlash that led to the proposal's abandonment, over criticism that it would be a vehicle for propaganda and constitute government interference with the PTS. The decision to give the operation responsibility to the CNA was made in May 2021 and the news agency promised to run the news on TaiwanPlus independently from its other operations.

The government of Taiwan has financed the service with NT$775 million ($23 million) and the aim of the service is to curb the influence of China Global Television Network operated by Beijing and project Taiwanese soft power through an all-English-language medium.

In 2022, the documentary series Road to Legacy—about indie pop in Taiwan—was released on the service. The show has received three nominations at the 57th Golden Bell Awards.

In August 2022, the National Communications Commission (NCC) announced that TaiwanPlus would be made available on terrestrial television for domestic audiences following the platform’s transfer to PTS management. The official launch took place in 3 October 2022. TaiwanPlus was also eyeing on the channel launch in the United States by early 2023.

References

External links 
 Taiwan+'s channel on YouTube

2021 establishments in Taiwan
Mass media in Taiwan
Television stations in Taiwan
Taiwan Broadcasting System
English-language television stations
International broadcasters
Internet properties established in 2021